Vantanea peruviana is a species of plant in the Humiriaceae family. It is endemic to Peru.

References

Humiriaceae
Trees of Peru
Vulnerable plants
Taxonomy articles created by Polbot